Xhafa or Xhafaj is an Albanian surname that may refer to
Daniel Xhafa (born 1977), Albanian football striker
Erion Xhafa (born 1982), Albanian football defender 
Fatmir Xhafaj (born 1959), Albanian politician
Fjodor Xhafa (born 1977), Albanian football striker 
Sislej Xhafa (born 1970), Kosovar Albanian contemporary artist

Albanian-language surnames